The 1990–91 Welsh Cup winners were Swansea City. The final was played at the National Stadium in Cardiff in front of an attendance of 5,000.

Fourth round

Quarter-finals

Semi-finals – 1st Leg

Semi-finals – 2nd Leg

Final

 
1990-91
1990–91 domestic association football cups